The Rapids is a 1922 American-Canadian silent drama film directed by David Hartford and starring Mary Astor, Harry T. Morey and Walter Miller. Location shooting took place at the St Mary's Rapids in Northern Ontario.

Cast
 Mary Astor as Elsie Worden
 Harry T. Morey as Robert Fisher Clarke
 Walter Miller as Jim Belding
 Harlan Knight as John Minton
 Charles Slattery as Henry Marsham
 Charles Wellesley as Bishop Sullivan
 John Webb Dillion as Louis Beaudette

References

Bibliography
 Munden, Kenneth White. The American Film Institute Catalog of Motion Pictures Produced in the United States, Part 1. University of California Press, 1997.

External links

1922 films
1922 drama films
1920s English-language films
American silent feature films
Silent American drama films
American black-and-white films
Canadian silent feature films
Canadian drama films
Canadian black-and-white films
Films distributed by W. W. Hodkinson Corporation
Films directed by David Hartford
1920s American films
1920s Canadian films